"Where Did All the Love Go?" is a song by English rock band Kasabian and is the second official single from their third album, West Ryder Pauper Lunatic Asylum. It was released on 10 August 2009.

Lyrics 
Guitarist Sergio Pizzorno explained the song's meaning to New Musical Express stating that "It's sitting at home seeing another kid get stabbed, everyone is scared and going, 'What the fuck is going on?" The song also speaks about the Internet, with Pizzorno elaborating in an interview with The Sun that "Kids today grow up really quickly and there's too much information. News channels, the internet and social networking sites. People aren't leaving their bedrooms and it's just crazy. The things that make you most happy are quite simple. That song is looking for the romantic image of life, when people looked out for each other."

Music video
According to Serge Pizzorno, the song's music video was inspired by Kenneth Anger's films like Scorpio Rising, Busby Berkeley and French cabaret.

Personnel
Kasabian
Tom Meighan – lead vocals
Sergio Pizzorno – guitars, synths, backing vocals
Chris Edwards – bass
Ian Matthews – drums
Additional personnel
Rosie Danvers – string direction
Wired Strings – strings

Chart performance
Following its release in August 2009, "Where Did All the Love Go?" entered the UK Singles Chart at a peak of #30. Although not as successful as the previous single "Fire", this single did prove popular on the radio.

Track listings
2-Track CD PARADISE64
 "Where Did All the Love Go?" – 4:18
 "Vlad the Impaler" (Zane Lowe Remix) - 4:32
10" PARADISE65
 "Where Did All the Love Go?" – 4:18
 "Where Did All the Love Go?" (Burns Remix) - 6:07
Digital Download
 "Where Did All the Love Go?" (Live at Le Live De La Sema) - 4:30
iTunes Bundle
 "Where Did All the Love Go?" – 4:18
 "Vlad the Impaler" (Zane Lowe Remix) - 4:32
 "Where Did All the Love Go?" (Burns Remix) - 6:07
 "Take Aim" (Dan the Automator Remix) - 5:17
2-Track Radio Promo CD
 "Where Did All the Love Go?" (Radio Edit) – 4:14
 "Where Did All the Love Go?" (Instrumental) – 4:26

References

External links
Townsend-records.co.uk

Kasabian songs
2009 singles
Songs written by Sergio Pizzorno
2009 songs
RCA Records singles
Columbia Records singles
Songs about crime